Denke is a surname of German origin, meaning "thank". Notable people with the surname include:

Denké Kossi Wazo (1958-2014), full name Julien Kossi Denke, Togolese international football player
Karl Denke (1860-1924), German serial killer and cannibal

See also
Denk (disambiguation)
Denker